The Taiwan Mulan Football League is referred to as TMFL, Taiwan's top-division a Women's football / soccer league. It is run by the Chinese Taipei Football Association  (CTFA).

History

During the 2020 season, the league played through the  COVID-19 pandemic , starting on April 11 and going until November 07.

Competition format

The six teams in the league play each other three times. The games are played on Saturday. The regular season comes to an end when each team has played 15 games in total and it is followed by playoffs: the third and sixth placed, the fourth and fifth placed face each other in a one-leg quarter-final, with the winner facing the first placed team or the second placed team in a one-leg semi-final. Then the winners face each other in a one-leg final. The winner of the final is crowned Taiwan Mulan Football League champion.

Teams (2022)

Champions

See also
 AFC Women's Club Championship
 Football in Taiwan

References

External links
official website

Taiwan
Women's football in Taiwan
Women's sports leagues in Taiwan
 
Sports leagues established in 2014
2014 establishments in Taiwan